René Dillen (born 18 June 1951) is a Belgian former professional racing cyclist. He rode in five editions of the Tour de France.

Major results
1972
 1st Fyen Rundt
 3rd Grand Prix des Marbriers
1973
 1st Kattekoers
 1st Stage 9 Peace Race
1974
 1st Stage 2 GP du Midi-Libre
 2nd Grand Prix d'Isbergues
1975
 1st Stage 5 Four Days of Dunkirk
1977
 1st Stage 3 Tour de Romandie
 1st Stage 2 Tour de Suisse
1979
 2nd Schaal Sels

References

External links
 

1951 births
Living people
Belgian male cyclists
People from Wilrijk
Cyclists from Antwerp
Tour de Suisse stage winners